The Inter-American Commission on Human Rights (the IACHR or, in the three other official languages Spanish, French, and Portuguese CIDH, Comisión Interamericana de los Derechos Humanos, Commission Interaméricaine des Droits de l'Homme, Comissão Interamericana de Direitos Humanos) is an autonomous organ of the Organization of American States (OAS).

The separate Inter-American Court of Human Rights is an autonomous judicial institution based in the city of San José, Costa Rica.  Together the Court and the Commission make up the human rights protection system of the OAS.

The IACHR is a permanent body, with headquarters in Washington, D.C., United States, and it meets in regular and special sessions several times a year to examine allegations of human rights violations in the hemisphere.

Its human rights duties stem from three documents:
 the OAS Charter
 the American Declaration of the Rights and Duties of Man
 the American Convention on Human Rights

History of the Inter-American human rights system 
The inter-American system for the protection of human rights emerged with the adoption of the American Declaration of the Rights and Duties of Man by the OAS in April 1948 the first international human rights instrument of a general nature, predating the Universal Declaration of Human Rights by more than six months.

The IACHR was created in 1959. It held its first meeting in 1960, and it conducted its first on-site visit to inspect the human rights situation in the Dominican Republic in 1961.

A major step in the development of the system was taken in 1965 when the commission was expressly authorized to examine specific cases of human rights violations. Since that date the IACHR has received thousands of petitions and has processed in excess of 12,000 individual cases.

In 1969, the guiding principles behind the American Declaration were taken, reshaped, and restated in the American Convention on Human Rights. The Convention defines the human rights that the states parties are required to respect and guarantee, and it also ordered the establishment of the Inter-American Court of Human Rights. It is currently binding on 24 of the OAS's 35 member states.

Functions 

The main task of the IACHR is to promote the observance and defense of human rights in the Americas.

In pursuit of this mandate it:

 Receives, analyzes, and investigates individual petitions alleging violations of specific human rights protected by the American Convention on Human Rights.
 Works to resolve petitions in a collaborative way that is amiable to both parties.
 Monitors the general human rights situation in the OAS's member states and, when necessary, prepares and publishes country-specific human rights reports.
 Conducts on-site visits to examine members' general human rights situation or to investigate specific cases.
 Encourages public awareness about human rights and related issues throughout the hemisphere.
 Holds conferences, seminars, and meetings with governments, NGOs, academic institutions, etc. to inform and raise awareness about issues relating to the inter-American human rights system.
 Issues member states with recommendations that, if adopted, would further the cause of human rights protection.
 Requests that states adopt precautionary measures to prevent serious and irreparable harm to human rights in urgent cases.
 Refers cases to the Inter-American Court of Human Rights, and litigates those same cases before the Court.
 Asks the Inter-American Court to provide advisory opinions on matters relating to the interpretation of the convention or other related instruments.

Rapporteurships and units

The IACHR has created several rapporteurships, a special rapporteurship and a unit to monitor OAS states' compliance with inter-American human rights treaties in the following areas:

 Rapporteurship on Migrant Workers and their Families
 Rapporteurship on the Rights of Women (the first rapporteurship created by the IACHR in 1994)
 Rapporteurship on the Rights of the Child
 Rapporteurship on the Rights of Indigenous Peoples
 Rapporteurship on the Rights of Persons Deprived of Liberty
 Rapporteurship on the Rights of Afro-Descendants and against Racial Discrimination
 Rapporteurship on Human Rights Defenders

The Special Rapporteur for Freedom of Expression and Economic, Social, Cultural, and Environmental Rights are the two special rapporteurships of the IACHR, having a rapporteur dedicated full-time to the job. The other rapporteurships are in the hands of the commissioners, who have other functions at the IACHR and also their own jobs in their home countries, since their work as commissioners is unpaid.

The Unit on the Rights of Lesbian, Gay, Trans, Bisexual, and Intersex Persons was created in 2011.

The IACHR also has a Press and Outreach Office.

Petitions
The Commission processes petitions lodged with it pursuant to its Rules of Procedure.

Petitions may be filed by NGOs or individuals. Unlike most court filings, petitions are confidential documents and are not made public. Petitions must meet three requirements; domestic remedies must have already been tried and failed (exhaustion), petitions must be filed within six months of the last action taken in a domestic system (timeliness), petitions can not be before another court (duplication of procedure).

Once a petition has been filed, it follows the following procedure:

 Petition is forwarded to the Secretariat and reviewed for completeness; if complete, it is registered and is given a case number. This is where the state is notified of the petition.
 Petition reviewed for admissibility.
 The Commission tries to find a friendly settlement.
 If no settlement is found, then briefs are filed by each side on the merits of the case.
 The Commission then files a report on the merits, known as an Article 50 report from relevant article of the convention. This is a basically a ruling by the commission with recommendations on how to solve the conflict. The Article 50 report is sent to the state. This is a confidential report; the petitioner does not get a full copy of this report.
 The state is given two months to comply with the recommendations of the report.
 The petitioner then has one month to file a petition asking for the issue to be sent to the Inter-American Court (only applicable if the State in question has recognized the competence of the Inter-American Court).
 The commission has three months, from the date the Article 50 report is given to the state, to either publish the Article 50 report or send the case to the Inter-American Court of Human Rights. Alternatively, the commission can also choose to monitor the situation. The American Convention establishes that if the report is not submitted to the Court within three months it may not be submitted in the future, but if the State asks for more time in order to comply with the recommendations of the Article 50 report, the Commission might grant it on the condition that the State signs a waiver on this requirement.

Criticisms

Politicization and position in debatable matters
The commission's performance has not been always welcomed. Among others, Venezuela has criticized  its politicization. Others criticize the commission's stress on certain issues over others. These criticisms have given rise to what was called the "Strengthening Process of the Commission". This process began in 2011, led by the States belonging to the Bolivarian Alliance for the Americas.

Location of its headquarters
Officers of Ecuador, Argentina, Bolivia, Guatemala, Nicaragua, and Venezuela, supported the motion for moving the commission's headquarters, which are currently in Washington, D.C. These countries suggested moving the IACHR's headquarters to a Member State to the American Convention of Human Rights. Among the suggested countries were Argentina, Costa Rica and Peru.

Composition 
The IACHR's ranking officers are its seven commissioners. The commissioners are elected by the OAS General Assembly, for four-year terms, with the possibility of re-election on one occasion, for a maximum period in office of eight years. They serve in a personal capacity and are not considered to represent their countries of origin but rather "all the member countries of the Organization" (Art. 35 of the convention).
The convention (Art. 34) says that they must "be persons of high moral character and recognized competence in the field of human rights".
No two nationals of the same member state may be commissioners simultaneously (Art. 37), and commissioners are required to refrain from participating in the discussion of cases involving their home countries.

Current commissioners

Past commissioners

Executive Secretaries 
The staff of the IACHR comprise its Secretariat, which is led by an Executive Secretary, who serves for what have recently been four-year, renewable contracts.

In August 2020, OAS Secretary General Luis Almagro announced that he would not renew Paulo Abrão's contract as Executive Secretary of the IACHR, citing 61 personnel complaints by staff of the organization. The Commissioners of the IACHR had unanimously approved the contract extension in January 2020, and expressed their "profound rejection" of Almagro's action "whose refusal to renew this contract breaks with a 20-year practice of respecting the IACHR's decision to appoint its own Executive Secretary and thus makes it difficult to obtain truth, justice, and reparation for those whose labor rights have been affected." UN High Commissioner for Human Rights Michelle Bachelet, Human Rights Watch, and the Mexican government have also objected to Abrao's removal.

Human rights violations investigated by the Inter-American Commission 
 Massacre of Trujillo (Colombia)
 Barrios Altos massacre (Peru)
 Lori Berenson (Peru)
 La Cantuta massacre (Peru)
 El Caracazo (Venezuela)
 Japanese embassy hostage crisis (Peru)
 Deaths in Ciudad Juárez (Mexico)
 Antoine Izméry (Haiti)
 Plan de Sánchez massacre (Guatemala)
 Censorship in Venezuela (Venezuela)
 District of Columbia voting rights (United States of America)
 Domestic violence protection in the case of Jessica Gonzales
 Extrajudicial detention in Guantanamo of Djamel Ameziane
 2014 Iguala mass kidnapping (Mexico)
 Internment of Japanese Latin Americans (United States)

References

External links 
 
 IACHR case law
 OAS Special Rapporteur on Freedom of Expression

Inter-American Commission on Human Rights
Intergovernmental human rights organizations
Organization of American States
Quasi-judicial bodies
Human rights in Latin America
Organizations established in 1959
1959 establishments in Washington, D.C.